Dieter Pfeifer (born 28 November 1936) is a German former swimmer. He competed at the 1956 Summer Olympics and the 1964 Summer Olympics.

References

1936 births
Living people
German male swimmers
Olympic swimmers of the United Team of Germany
Swimmers at the 1956 Summer Olympics
Swimmers at the 1964 Summer Olympics
Sportspeople from Chemnitz